Mitja Dragšič (born July 21, 1979 in Maribor) is a Slovenian alpine skier, specialized in slalom.

Dragšič represented Slovenia at the 2002 and 2010 Winter Olympics. His best result in the Alpine skiing World Cup are two 4th places, both in slalom.

References 

1979 births
Living people
Slovenian male alpine skiers
Alpine skiers at the 2002 Winter Olympics
Alpine skiers at the 2010 Winter Olympics
Olympic alpine skiers of Slovenia
Sportspeople from Maribor